Kłopoty-Stanisławy  (Polish: Troubles-Stanislavs) is a village in north-eastern Poland, located in the administrative district of Gmina Siemiatycze, within Siemiatycze County, Podlaskie Voivodeship.

References

Villages in Siemiatycze County